The Madonna of the Cherries is a 1515 painting by Titian, heavily influenced by the work of Giovanni Bellini. Originally oil on wood, it was later transferred to canvas. During the 17th century it formed part of the collection of Archduke Leopold Wilhelm, where it was copied by David Teniers. It is now in the Kunsthistorisches Museum in Vienna.

Theatrum Pictorium
This painting was documented in David Teniers the Younger's catalog Theatrum Pictorium of the art collection of Archduke Leopold Wilhelm in 1659 and again in 1673, but the portrait had already enjoyed notoriety in Teniers' portrayals of the Archduke's art collection:

References

1515 paintings
Cherries
Paintings in the collection of the Kunsthistorisches Museum
Paintings in the collection of the Archduke Leopold Wilhelm of Austria